Alexandru Usatiuc-Bulgăr (1915–2003) was a Moldovan activist and a political prisoner in the former Soviet Union.

Biography 
Between 1969 and 1971, he was a founder of a clandestine National Patriotic Front of Bessarabia and Northern Bukovina, established by several young intellectuals in Chișinău, totaling over 100 members, vowing to fight for the establishment of a Moldavian Democratic Republic, its secession from the Soviet Union and union with Romania. In December 1971, following an informative note from Ion Stănescu, the President of the Council of State Security of the Socialist Republic of Romania, to Yuri Andropov, the chief of the KGB, Usatiuc-Bulgăr as well as Valeriu Graur, Alexandru Șoltoianu, and Gheorghe Ghimpu were arrested and later sentenced to long prison terms.

Usatiuc-Bulgăr was condemned to 12 years in prison.

He was the president of the Association of former political deportees.

Legacy 
The Commission for the Study of the Communist Dictatorship in Moldova will study and analyze the 1940-1991 period of the communist regime.

Works 
 Alexandru Usatiuc-Bulgăr "Cu gîndul la "O lume între două lumi": eroi, martiri, oameni-legendă" ("Thinking of 'A World between Two Worlds': Heroes, Martyrs, Legendary People"), Publisher: Lyceum, Orhei (1999)

References

Romanian people of Moldovan descent
Moldovan independence activists
1915 births
2003 deaths
National Patriotic Front (Moldova) politicians
Moldovan anti-communists